Valentine Howe Sr. (1841 - 1904) was a builder and state legislator in North Carolina. He was elected in 1887 to the North Carolina House of Representatives. He defeated Alfred Moore Waddell. He was from a prominent family of carpenters and builders. He served as an alderman, vestryman, volunteer with the Cape Fear Fire Company, and was an Odd Fellow. He died in 1904 aged 63. He was African American.

See also
African-American officeholders during and following the Reconstruction era

References

1841 births
1904 deaths
Members of the North Carolina House of Representatives
Independent Order of Odd Fellows
North Carolina politicians
African-American politicians